Kirill is a male given name, deriving from the Greek name Κύριλλος (Kyrillos) which in turn derives from Greek κύριος (kyrios) "lord". There are many variant forms of the name: Cyril, Cyrill, Kyrill, Kiryl, Kirillos, Kyryl, Kiril, Kyrylo, Kiro.

Kirill may refer to:

People
Kirill I of Moscow (born 1946), Russian Patriarch of Moscow and all Russia	
Kirill Vladimirovich, Grand Duke of Russia
Kirill Alekseenko (born 1997), Russian chess grandmaster
Kirill Aleshin (born 1997), Russian ice dancer
Kirill Alexeyev (born 1981), Russian ice hockey player
Kirill Bichutsky (born 1984), American photographer, businessman
Kirill Dmitriev (born 1975), Russian businessman
Kirill Eskov (born 1956), Russian writer
Kirill Florensky (1915–1982), Russian geochemist and planetologist
Kirill Formanchuk, Russian activist for motorists' rights 
Kirill Gerasimov (born 1971), Russian poker player
Kirill Gerstein (born 1979), Russian pianist
Kirill Gevorgian (born 1953), Russian diplomat and jurist
Kirill Gorbunov (1822–1893), Russian painter
Kirill Gurov (1918–1994), Russian theoretical physicist 
Kirill Ikonnikov (born 1984), Russian hammer thrower
Kirill Kaprizov (born 1997), Russian ice hockey player
Kirill Karabits (born 1976), Ukrainian conductor
Kirill Khaliavin (born 1990), Russian ice dancer 	
Kirill Kochubei (born 1986), Russian football player
Kirill Kombarov (born 1987), Russian football player
Kirill Kondrashin (1914–1981), Russian conductor
Kirill Y. Kondratyev (1920–2006), Russian atmospheric physicist
Kirill Kononenko (born 1992), Russian ice hockey player
Kirill Kravchenko (born 1976), Russian businessman
Kirill Kurochkin (born 1988), Russian football player
Kirill Lavrov (1925–2007), Russian actor and director
Kirill Lyamin (born 1986), Russian ice hockey player
Kirill Mazurov (1914–1989), Belarusian politician
Kirill Meretskov (1897–1968), Russian general
Kirill Molchanov (1922–1982), Russian composer
Kirill Moskalenko (1902–1985), Russian general
Kirill Nababkin (born 1986), Russian football player
Kirill Naryshkin (1623–1691), Russian aristocrat
Kirill Nikonorov (born 1990), Russian ice hockey player
Kirill Pavlyuchek (born 1984), Belarusian football player
Kirill Petrenko (born 1972), Russian-Austrian conductor
Kirill Petrov (born 1990), Russian ice hockey player 
Kirill Pishchalnikov (born 1987), Russian basketball player
Kirill Razumovski (1728–1803), Russian aristocrat
Kirill Reznik (born 1974), American politician
Kirill Rodin (born 1963), Russian cellist 
Kirill Safronov (born 1981), Russian ice hockey player
Kirill G. Seleznyov (born 1974), Russian businessman
Kirill I. Seleznyov (born 1985), Russian football player
Kirill Shchelkin (1911–1968), Russian nuclear scientist
Kirill Sosunov (born 1975), Russian long jumper
Kirill Starkov (born 1987), Danish ice hockey player
Kirill Tomashevich (1852–1909), Russian politician
Kirill Troussov (born 1982), German violinist
Kirill Turichenko (born 1983), Ukrainian musician
Kirill Vakhromeev (Philaret; 1935–2021), Russian bishop
Kirill Veselov, Russian ski-orienteerer
Kirill A. Yevstigneyev (1917–1996), Russian fighter pilot

See also
Cyril (disambiguation)
Cyrille
Kiril
Kirill (online drama)
Kyril
Kyrill (disambiguation)

Masculine given names
Slavic given names
Russian masculine given names